Thomas Ball (born 13 February 1951) is a South African former cricketer. He played sixteen first-class matches for Border between 1977 and 1986.

References

External links
 

1951 births
Living people
South African cricketers
Border cricketers
Cricketers from East London, Eastern Cape